The linea splendens is a band of longitudinal fibers within the spinal pia mater, lying along the surface of the anterior median fissure of the spinal cord and forming a sheath for the anterior spinal artery.

References

Spinal cord